The 1961 Oakland Raiders season was the team's second in the American Football League. Based in Oakland, they played their home games in San Francisco at Candlestick Park.  

The Raiders tried to improve on their 6–8 record from 1960, but finished last in the AFL West at 2–12, dropping their final six games. They set an AFL record in 1961, posting a point differential of negative-221, and surrendered 36 rushing touchdowns, a pro football record.

The following year, the Raiders moved to the new Frank Youell Field in Oakland, and played in that temporary venue for four seasons.

Season schedule

Standings

Players

References

Oakland
Oakland Raiders seasons
Oakland